Oirat or Elut (Èlǔtè) may refer to:

Oirats, the westernmost group of the Mongols
Oirat language

Language and nationality disambiguation pages